Nicolas Bresciani (born 12 May 1997) is an Italian professional footballer who plays for Seravezza Pozzi, as a defender.

Career
Born in Pontremoli, Bresciani has played for Seravezza Pozzi, Livorno and  Ravenna.

On 12 July 2019, he joined Reggina on loan.

In January 2021 he signed for Carrarese.

On 27 September 2021 he returned to Seravezza Pozzi in Serie D.

References

1997 births
Sportspeople from the Province of Massa-Carrara
Footballers from Tuscany
Living people
Italian footballers
U.S. Livorno 1915 players
Ravenna F.C. players
Reggina 1914 players
Carrarese Calcio players
Serie C players
Serie D players
Association football defenders